Helen Howard (born Helen Wister Davis) was an American actress who appeared in a string of B-movie westerns in the late 1910s and the 1920s.

Biography 
Howard was born in Philadelphia, Pennsylvania, to David Davis and Laurel Hewlett. Her father died when she was young, and she ended up taking her stepfather Charles Howard's surname. As a teenager living in Santa Barbara, California, she began appearing in films made by the local American Film Manufacturing Company, where her older brother David Howard worked as a director.

After AFMC (aka Flying "A") went under in 1921, she and David appear to have both followed the industry to Los Angeles. Helen received much notice from the press for her performance in the 1922 film My Wild Irish Rose, and David went on to direct more than dozens of films in the 1920s, 1930s, and 1940s. Little is known about what happened to her after the 1920s.

Selected filmography 
 The First Auto (1927)
 Quick Change (1925)
 Captain Blood (1924)
 Deserted at the Altar (1922)
 My Wild Irish Rose (1922)
 When Romance Rides (1922)
 The Child Thou Gavest Me (1921)
 The Little Fool (1921)
 Blind Youth (1920)
 Brass Buttons (1919)
 The Ghost of Rosy Taylor (1918)
 The Primitive Woman (1918)
 The Midnight Trail (1918)
 The Sea Master (1917)

References 

American film actresses
Actresses from Philadelphia
Actresses from Pennsylvania
1897 births
1957 deaths
20th-century American actresses
20th-century American people